Dalang is a town under the jurisdiction of Dongguan prefecture-level city in Guangdong province, China.

Transportation 

Daojiao will host two Dongguan Rail Transit stations under the current plans for construction of Line 1:

 DalangWest (Dalang West)
 Dalang

There is a bus service from Dalang to Shenzhen Bao'an International Airport in Shenzhen.

References

Geography of Dongguan
Towns in Guangdong